Gamelin (died 1271) was a 13th-century Bishop of St Andrews. He had previously been the chancellor to King Alexander III of Scotland, as well as Papal chaplain.  He was postulated to the see in Lent, 1255, and confirmed by Pope Alexander IV on 1 July 1255, who also agreed to overlook his apparent "defect of birth".  Gamelin was a Comyn supporter, and was banished from the kingdom sometime in 1256, a year after the Comyns' rival Alan Durward had seized power.  After the Durwards were overthrown, he was able to return, and was certainly back in Scotland by 1270.  He died the following year at "Inchmurdauch" (Innse Muiredaich).

References
Dowden, John, The Bishops of Scotland, ed. J. Maitland Thomson, (Glasgow, 1912)
Campbell, Marion, Alexander III: King of Scots, House of Lochar, (Colonsay, 1999)
Young, Alan & Cumming, George, The Real Patriots of Early Scottish Independence, Birlinn, (Edinburgh, 2014)

1271 deaths
Bishops of St Andrews
13th-century Scottish Roman Catholic bishops
Lord chancellors of Scotland
Year of birth unknown